The Men's 100 metre breaststroke competition of the 2018 FINA World Swimming Championships (25 m) was held on 11 and 12 December 2018 at the Hangzhou Olympic Sports Center.

Records
Prior to the competition, the existing world and championship records were as follows.

The following new records were set during this competition:

Results

Heats
The heats were started at 11:25.

Semifinals
The semifinals were held at 20:04.

Semifinal 1

Semifinal 2

Final
The final was held at 19:29.

References

Men's 100 metre breaststroke